The knockout stage of the 2012 Africa Cup of Nations ran from 4 February, and ended with the final on 12 February. The top two placed teams from each preliminary group advanced to this stage.

Qualified teams

Bracket

All times are West Africa Time (UTC+1).

Quarterfinals

Zambia vs. Sudan

Assistant referees:
Jason Damoo (Seychelles)
Angesom Ogbamariam (Eritrea)
Fourth official:
Mohamed Benouza (Algeria)

Ivory Coast vs. Equatorial Guinea

Assistant referees:
Jean-Claude Birumushahu (Burundi)
Felicien Kabanda (Rwanda)
Fourth official:
Badara Diatta (Senegal)

Gabon vs. Mali

Assistant referees:
Redouane Achik (Morocco)
Albdelhak Etchiali (Algeria)
Fourth official:
Daniel Bennett (South Africa)

Ghana vs. Tunisia

Assistant referees:
Evarist Menkouande (Cameroon)
Djibril Camara (Senegal)
Fourth official:
Gehad Grisha (Egypt)

Semifinals

Zambia vs. Ghana

Assistant referees:
Redouane Achik (Morocco)
Jean-Claude Birumushahu (Burundi)
Fourth official:
Djamel Haimoudi (Algeria)

Mali vs. Ivory Coast

Assistant referees:
Jason Damoo (Seychelles)
Angesom Ogbamariam (Eritrea)
Fourth official:
Slim Jedidi (Tunisia)

Third place match

Man of the Match:
Cheick Diabaté (Mali)

Assistant referees:
Peter Edibe (Nigeria)
Moffat Champiti (Malawi)
Fourth official:
Bakary Gassama (Gambia)

Final

Assistant referees:
Bechir Hassani (Tunisia)
Evarist Menkouande (Cameroon)
Fourth official:
Eddy Maillet (Seychelles)

Notes

References

External links
Official website

2012 Africa Cup of Nations